Mikhail Viktorovich Merkulov (born 26 January 1994) is a Russian footballer who plays as a left-back for Croatian First Football League club Rijeka.

Club career
He made his debut in the Russian Second Division for FC Rotor Volgograd on 5 June 2011 in a game against FC MITOS Novocherkassk.

He made his Russian Football Premier League for FC Ural Sverdlovsk Oblast on 28 April 2016 in a game against PFC CSKA Moscow.

On 6 June 2020, he signed a two-year contract with FC Rubin Kazan after his contract with Ural had ended.

On 28 July 2021, he moved to Croatian club Rijeka.

Career statistics

Club

Notes

External links

References

1994 births
People from Kamyshin
Living people
Russian footballers
Russia youth international footballers
Russia under-21 international footballers
Association football defenders
FC Rotor Volgograd players
FC Energiya Volzhsky players
FC Ural Yekaterinburg players
FC Baikal Irkutsk players
FC Rubin Kazan players
HNK Rijeka players
Russian Premier League players
Croatian Football League players
Russian expatriate footballers
Expatriate footballers in Croatia
Russian expatriate sportspeople in Croatia
Sportspeople from Volgograd Oblast